Douglas James Wendt (January 1927 – 1 February 2019) was an Australian soccer player.

Playing career

Club career
After playing as a junior for New Lambton and Police Boys' Club, he joined Adamstown where he made his debut in senior football. He later played for Auburn. In 1956 he transferred to Gladesville-Ryde.

International career
Wendt played several matches for Australia in B international matches, though in only one match considered to be a full international. His one full international match was a 6-0 loss to South Africa in Sydney.

References

People from New South Wales
Australian soccer players
Australia international soccer players
2019 deaths
1927 births
Association football wing halves